The Alpha Centaurids are a meteor shower in the constellation Centaurus, peaking in early February each year. The average magnitude is around 2.5, with a peak of about three meteors an hour.

They have been observed since 1969, with a single possible recorded observation in 1938.

References

Centaurus (constellation)
February events
Meteor showers